Wang Yonghong (born June 1969) is a Chinese politician who is the current director and party branch secretary of National Government Offices Administration, in office since June 2022.

He is a representative of the 20th National Congress of the Chinese Communist Party and an alternate member of the 20th Central Committee of the Chinese Communist Party.

Biography
Wang was born in June 1969.

After university, he was assigned to the National Government Offices Administration, where he successively served as deputy director of the Financial Management Department, deputy director of the Logistics Reform and Integrated Management Department, director of the Training Center, director of the Financial Management Department, and director of the Dongba Service Center. He was promoted to deputy director of the National Government Offices Administration in April 2017. In June 2022, he was promoted again to become director.

References

1969 births
Living people
Chinese politicians
Chinese Communist Party politicians
Alternate members of the 20th Central Committee of the Chinese Communist Party